Ramdia is an Indian village in Kamrup rural district in the state of Assam. It is situated on the north bank of river Brahmaputra 30 km from the city Guwahati, near Hajo town. Farming, local businesses, and government service are main professions of the people of Ramdia.

Education
Ramdia has several government and non-government schools and a college, including:
Ramdia Higher Secondary School
Sankardev Vidya Niketan Ramdia
Binandi Chandra Medhi College, Ramdia
Daffodil English School Ramdia
Ujankuri M.E. School
Kaliram Medhi Girls High School Ramdia
Ramdia Girls High School
Ujankuri High School
Hahdia L.P. School, Hahdia
Sunrise English Academy
Aloran Educational Trust, Ramdia
Ancholik Jatiya Vidyalay

Transport
The village is near National Highway 27 and connected to nearby towns and cities with regular buses and other modes of transportation. Regular bus services along with local passenger vehicles are available from Guwahati.

Notable people

Kaliram Medhi
Saurav Kumar Chaliha

See also
 Sualkuchi

References

Villages in Kamrup district